Heim theory, first proposed by German physicist Burkhard Heim publicly in 1957, is an attempt to develop a theory of everything in theoretical physics. The theory claims to bridge some of the disagreements between quantum mechanics and general relativity. The theory has received little attention in the scientific literature and is regarded as being outside mainstream science but has attracted some interest in popular and fringe media.

In his book "Deep Space Propulsion: A Roadmap to Interstellar Flight" aerospace engineer and physicist Kelvin Long, co-founder of the Initiative for Interstellar Studies, describes the theory as an idea "that could represent some element of a future breakthrough in propulsion physics" but states that he has "no opinion for or against" this theory.

Development
Heim attempted to resolve incompatibilities between quantum theory and general relativity. To meet that goal, he developed a mathematical approach based on quantizing spacetime.  Others have attempted to apply Heim theory to nonconventional space propulsion and faster than light concepts, as well as the origin of dark matter.

Heim claimed that his theory yields particle masses directly from fundamental physical constants and that the resulting masses are in agreement with experiment, but this claim has not been confirmed. Heim's theory is formulated mathematically in six or more dimensions and uses Heim's own version of difference equations.

References

External links
 Chronological Overview of the Research of Burkhard Heim (5 pages, English translation by John Reed, Feb 2011)
 Heim Theory Falsified. Next Big Future. 1 July 2011. This article posts John Reed's comments.
 General Discussions. Heim Theory. The Physics Forum. 2013-03-26.
 Heim Theory Translation. Borje Mansson and Anton Mueller. 2006.
 Discussion about Burkhard Heim's Particle Structure Theory. Physforum. May 2011.

Faster-than-light travel
Fringe physics
Quantum gravity